Active Transportation Alliance (formerly Chicagoland Bicycle Federation) is a non-governmental, not-for-profit 501(c)(3) organization with a mission to promote better biking, walking, and transportation options.

It publishes the Chicago Bike Map with Chicago Department of Transportation.

Its advocacy efforts include:

 Large-scale bike sharing
 Car-free Streets
 Fair Fares Chicagoland
 Chicago Streets for Cycling Plan 2020
 Improving Lakefront Trail
 Transit Future

Events
 Bike the Drive
 Boulevard Lakefront Tour
 Chicago Bike Week
 Winter Bike Challenge

References

External links

Cycling in Chicago
Non-profit organizations based in the United States
Environmental organizations based in Chicago